Janko Konstantinov (18 January 1926 in Bitola, Kingdom of Serbs, Croats and Slovenes – 2010) is a Macedonian architect and artist.

Education and career

Janko Konstantinov studied at Faculty of Architecture in Belgrade under famous designers and educators such as: Alexander Deroko, Milan Zlokovik,j Mate Bajlon, and Nicholas Dobrovikj. He graduated in 1952. Then in 1954, he went on to specialize in his field at the Royal Danish Academy of Art and Architecture in Copenhagen. Konstantinov gained experience working on projects in Finland, where he worked with the legendary Finnish architect Alvar Aalto, Sweden and the USA.

From 1958 to 1964, worked as a designer in the studio of designer Victor Gruen. He also worked in the studio Daniel Johnson Medehal Los Angeles, the United States. After the tragic events of the 1963 earthquake, Konstantinov returned to Skopje to help rebuild the city. His Telecommunications Centre and Post Office (built in different stages between 1974 and 1989) are two of his most recognizable contributions to the rebuild of Skopje.

He worked in Bitola in the studio of the famous Russian painter Ivan Meljnikov. Janko Konstantinov was inspired by the beauty of his country, and his common motifs were landscapes of Ohrid. In 2009, Konstantinov donated 108 of his paintings, mostly watercolors, to the Institute and Museum of Bitola. In 2006, The Art Gallery of the Macedonian Academy of Sciences and Arts, held an exhibition of his work.

Architectural works

His architectural works include:

 From 1955 to 1958 he was the architect for the Swedish capital of Stockholm, the Bureaus of S.Tregord, N.. Kehinger and G.Letstorm. He was responsible for designing the Helsingorden school, a school in Falun, a technical high school in Stockholm, administration and the commercial center and residential in the neighborhood of Helsingorden.
 A museum in the city Olborg in Denmark,1958
 A covered swimming pool in Los Angeles, 1960-1962
 The Science Center Southern California, 1962 to 1965
 The Seismological Station Valandovo, 1965
 The "Youth House, seven secretaries of SKOJ" in Zagreb
 The Skopje City Hall, 1982
 A Shopping Centre in Skopje
 The monument of the Ilinden KRU
 Optical in Skopje
 An administrative building of GP Pelagonia shaped bank in Tehran
 A multipurpose tower in Kuwait
 A villa in Greece villa in Thessaloniki
 The Pedagogical High School "Nikola Karev" in Skopje, 1965-1968
 The Medical Center in Skopje 1968-1970
 The PTT Telecommunications Center in Skopje,1972-1974 and 1979-1980
 The hotel "Aleksandar Palace"
 The "You Mobile" MK in complex Macedonian Telecommunications
 The "Magic Design Center" in Skopje

Awards
Architect Konstantinov holds numerous awards:

fighting plaque architecture in Macedonia in 1969 Pedagogical High School "Nikola Karev" in Skopje,

fighting plaque architecture in Macedonia the 1975 Telecommunications Center in Skopje,

October 11 award of SR Macedonia for architecture in 1975 Telecommunications Center in Skopje,

References

External links
 The Suicidal Architecture of Skopje Macedonia
 Communist Architecture of Skopje, Macedonia – A Brutal, Modern, Cosmic, Era

Macedonian architects
1926 births
2010 deaths
People from Bitola
Macedonian painters
Macedonian artists